Streets of New York is a 1939 American film directed by William Nigh.

The film is also known as The Abe Lincoln of Ninth Avenue and The Abraham Lincoln of the 4th Avenue.

Plot 

"Jimmy" (Jackie Cooper) and crippled "Gimpy" (Martin Spellman) run the corner newsstand. Spike (David Durand), a neighborhood delinquent, doesn't like the business being on his turf, and does everything he can to get them into trouble, and disrupt their circulation.

When they get in trouble, Judge Carroll (George Irving) tries to help them out. He doesn't want Jimmy going bad, like his big brother, the racketeer, 'Tap' (Dick Purcell), while Jimmy is trying to go to school and teach himself to be a lawyer, like his hero, Abraham Lincoln.

Jimmy has to choose between the right thing and family when his brother comes to him for help.

The story starts with Jimmy Keenan as a strong independent teenager who owns a news stand while going to night school to study to become a lawyer. Jimmy is also a kindhearted man who takes care of a crippled kid named Gimpy after Gimpy's mother died. While he is trying to be an honorable man, he is weighed down by the reputation of his brother Tap Keenan, a well-known criminal. As he continues his pursuit of becoming a lawyer, a neighborhood teenage gang led by Spike is trying to get him into trouble.

One night during school, Jimmy is notified that Gimpy and rest of Spike's gang were arrested for gambling. Trying to get Gimpy out of trouble, Jimmy goes to the court and convinces the judge that Gimpy is not actually gambling since there was no evidence of involvement with money. Judge Carroll is surprised by how well spoken Jimmy is and lets the kids go. After the court hearing, Judge Carroll learns that Jimmy is the brother of Tap Keenan. He tells Jimmy to continue to pursue his dream, hoping he will not be like his brother. Jimmy goes to see his brother on their mother's birthday. Tap tells Jimmy he can pay for Jimmy's college and wants Jimmy to work for him afterwards. Jimmy declines and tells Tap to stay disconnected with him in the future.
	
After a Christmas gathering at Judge Corall's home, Jimmy finds out that his brother has killed a man, and is currently hiding from the police. Spike comes to taunt Jimmy and mocks his mother, and a fight breaks out between them. Spike and his gang flees the scene after losing to Jimmy and his friends. Jimmy returns to his room only to find that his brother is hiding in there. Tap tries to convince Jimmy to help him to escape and will be able to live a good life with the money he has, but Jimmy insist Tap to turn himself in. During the conversation, Gimpy tries to open the door to find Jimmy. Not knowing who it is, Tap shoots through the door injuring Gimpy. Jimmy then wrestles with Tap, and police arrest Tap a few minutes later. After a few days, Jimmy is told that Gimpy will be back later. Jimmy then walks away from the newspaper stand, and continues to pursue his dream to become lawyer, like his hero Abraham Lincoln.

Cast 
Jackie Cooper as James Michael 'Jimmy' Keenan
Martin Spellman as William McKinley 'Gimpy' Smith
Marjorie Reynolds as Anne Carroll
Dick Purcell as T.P. 'Tap' Keenan
George Cleveland as Pop O'Toole
George Irving as Judge Carroll
Robert Emmett O'Connor as Police Officer Burke
Sidney Miller as Jiggsy, newsboy
David Durand as Spike Morgan
Buddy Pepper as Flatfoot, newsboy

References

External links 

1939 films
1939 crime drama films
Monogram Pictures films
American crime drama films
American black-and-white films
Films directed by William Nigh
1930s English-language films
1930s American films